The 1991 San Francisco Giants season was the Giants' 109th season in Major League Baseball, their 34th season in San Francisco since their move from New York following the 1957 season, and their 32nd at Candlestick Park. The team finished in fourth place in the National League West with a 75–87 record, 19 games behind the Atlanta Braves.

Offseason
 November 9, 1990: Bud Black signed as a free agent with the San Francisco Giants.
 December 4, 1990: Dave Righetti signed as a free agent with the San Francisco Giants.
December 4, 1990: Darren Lewis was traded by the Oakland Athletics with a player to be named later to the San Francisco Giants for Ernest Riles. The Oakland Athletics sent Pedro Pena (minors) (December 17, 1990) to the San Francisco Giants to complete the trade.
March 30, 1991: Darnell Coles was signed as a free agent with the San Francisco Giants.

Regular season

Season standings

Record vs. opponents

Opening Day starters
Kevin Bass
Mike Benjamin
John Burkett
Will Clark
Steve Decker
Willie McGee
Kevin Mitchell
Robby Thompson
Matt Williams

Notable transactions
June 3, 1991: William Van Landingham was drafted by the San Francisco Giants in the 5th round of the 1991 amateur draft. Player signed June 6, 1991.
June 19, 1991: Rick Reuschel was released by the San Francisco Giants.

Roster

Player stats

Batting

Starters by position 
Note: Pos = Position; G = Games played; AB = At bats; H = Hits; Avg. = Batting average; HR = Home runs; RBI = Runs batted in

Other batters
Note: G = Games played; AB = At bats; H = Hits; Avg. = Batting average; HR = Home runs; RBI = Runs batted in

Pitching

Starting pitchers 
Note: G = Games pitched; IP = Innings pitched; W = Wins; L = Losses; ERA = Earned run average; SO = Strikeouts

Other pitchers 
Note: G = Games pitched; IP = Innings pitched; W = Wins; L = Losses; ERA = Earned run average; SO = Strikeouts

Relief pitchers 
Note: G = Games pitched; W = Wins; L = Losses; SV = Saves; ERA = Earned run average; SO = Strikeouts

Award winners
Will Clark, National League Leader, Slugging (.536)
Robby Thompson 2B, Willie Mac Award
All-Star Game

Farm system

LEAGUE CHAMPIONS: Shreveport, Clinton

References

External links
 1991 San Francisco Giants at Baseball Reference
 1991 San Francisco Giants at Baseball Almanac

San Francisco Giants seasons
San Francisco Giants season
San Fran